Kagel may refer to:
 Kagel, Iran, a village in Kurdistan Province, Iran
 Kagel, Missouri, a community in the United States
 Jeffrey Kagel (born 1947, Long Island, New York), U.S. vocalist
 Mauricio Kagel (1931–2008), a composer